Joseph Alfred Cranston (September 8, 1898 – December 2, 1973) was an American military officer and boxer who competed in the 1920 Summer Olympics. He was eliminated in the second round of the middleweight class after losing to the eventual gold medalist Harry Mallin.

Biography
Joseph Cranston was born in Leavenworth, Kansas on September 8, 1898. He attended Leavenworth High School, and graduated from the United States Military Academy at West Point on November 1, 1918, after which he was commissioned as a second lieutenant in the Army. He was promoted to brigadier general during World War II. For his service in the China Burma India Theater, he received the Distinguished Service Medal, Bronze Star, and Chinese Order of the Cloud and Banner. He retired from the Army on July 31, 1948.

He died at Walter Reed Army Medical Center on December 2, 1973, and was buried at Arlington National Cemetery.

References

External links
 list of American boxers

1898 births
1973 deaths
Middleweight boxers
Olympic boxers of the United States
Boxers at the 1920 Summer Olympics
Sportspeople from Kansas City, Missouri
Boxers from Missouri
American male boxers
Brigadier generals
Burials at Arlington National Cemetery
Recipients of the Distinguished Service Medal (US Army)
United States Army generals of World War II
United States Military Academy alumni